Jagadhri Assembly constituency is one of the 90 constituencies in the Haryana Legislative Assembly of Haryana, a northern state of India. Ateli is also part of Ambala Lok Sabha constituency.

Members of Legislative Assembly

See also

 Jagadhri
 Yamuna Nagar district
 List of constituencies of Haryana Legislative Assembly

References

Assembly constituencies of Haryana
Yamunanagar district